Eugoa euryphaea is a moth of the family Erebidae. It is found in India (Sikkim).

References

 Natural History Museum Lepidoptera generic names catalog

euryphaea
Moths described in 1914